The  ("dragon" or "serpent", plural ) was a military standard of the Roman cavalry.

The  may have been introduced to the Roman army after the Dacian wars by Dacian, Sarmatian units in the 2nd century.

Literary descriptions

The Scythian banners are dracontes held aloft on standard-length poles. They are made of colored cloths stitched together, and from the head along the entire body to the tail, they look like snakes. When the horses bearing these devices are not in motion, you see only variegated streamers hanging down. During the charge is when they most resemble creatures: they are inflated by the wind, and even make a sort of hissing sound as the air is forced through them.

Arrian says the colorful banners offer visual pleasure and amazement, but also help the riders position themselves correctly in the complicated drills. The Gallo-Roman Latin poet Sidonius Apollinaris offers a similar, if more empurpled, description.

Depictions
The  is depicted on the Ludovisi battle sarcophagus, above the horseman who is the central figure in the composition. It appears in several other reliefs, including the Arch of Galerius and the Arch of Constantine, both from the early 4th century.

See also 
 Dacian Draco
 Clan of Ostoja

Notes

References

External links 
 The Draco, the Late Roman military standard

Ancient Roman military standards
Dragons